Joaquín Bastús (1799–1873) was a Spanish writer and pedagogue. He wrote the Diccionario Histórico Enciclopédico.

References 

Spanish male writers
1799 births
1873 deaths